Bromoxynil is an organic compound with the formula HOBr2C6H2CN.  It is classified as a nitrile herbicide, and as such sold under many trade names.  It is a white solid.  It works by inhibiting photosynthesis. It is moderately toxic to mammals.

Production and use
It is produced by bromination of 4-hydroxybenzonitrile.

It is a post-emergence to control annual broadleaved weeds.

Degradation
Bromoxynil decomposes with a half life of approximately two weeks in soil.  Persistence increases in soils with elevated clay or organic matter content, suggesting the compound has somewhat limited bioavailability to microorganisms in these environments.  Under aerobic conditions in soils or pure cultures, products of bromoxynil degradation often retain the original bromine groups.  The herbicide, and one of its common degradation products (3,5-dibromo-4-hydroxybenzoic acid) have been shown to undergo metabolic reductive dehalogenation by the microorganism Desulfitobacterium chlororespirans.

In the Great Plains region of Canada, where it is widely used on cereal grains, average levels detected in drinking water were 1 nanogram per liter.  In one case as high as 384 nanograms per liter were detected.  Levels of bromoxynil were consistently lower than of several other pesticides tested, and it was observed to undergo greater reduction in water treatment than the others.

Safety
Lethal doses in mammals range between 60 and 600 milligrams ingested per kilogram, and teratogenic effects have been observed in rats and rabbits above 30 milligrams per kilogram. Chronic exposure for more than one year in humans caused symptoms of weight loss, fever, vomiting, headache, and urinary problems in one documented case.

In the United States it is distributed as a restricted use pesticide in toxicity class II (moderately toxic) and not available for homeowner use.

References

External links

Herbicides
Bromoarenes
Nitriles
Phenols